Guna Ozola (née Āboliņa; born 1 January 1990) is a Latvian footballer who plays as a defender for Sieviešu Futbola Līga club FK Liepāja. She has been a member of the Latvia women's national team.

References

1990 births
Living people
Latvian women's footballers
Women's association football defenders
Gintra Universitetas players
FK Liepājas Metalurgs (women) players
FC Skonto/Cerība-46.vsk. players
Latvia women's youth international footballers
Latvia women's international footballers
Latvian expatriate footballers
Latvian expatriate sportspeople in Lithuania
Expatriate women's footballers in Lithuania